Talang 2021 is the eleventh season of Swedish Talang and is broadcast on TV4 from 15 January – 19 March 2021. Presenters for this season are Pär Lernström and Samir Badran, the jury consists of Sarah Dawn Finer, David Batra, Bianca Ingrosso and Edward af Sillen.
Jury members  Alexander Bard and LaGaylia Frazier left the show after season ten and was replaced by Sillen and Dawn Finer.

Magician Johan Ståhl won the final 19 March.

Episodes

References

Talang (Swedish TV series)
2021 Swedish television seasons